The RD-701 (Rocket Engine 701) is a liquid-fuel rocket engine developed by Energomash, Russia (USSR at that time). It was briefly proposed to propel the reusable MAKS space plane, but the project was cancelled shortly before the end of USSR. The RD-701 is a tripropellant engine that uses a staged combustion cycle with afterburning of oxidizer-rich hot turbine gas. The RD-701 has two modes. Mode  1 uses three components: LOX as an oxidizer and a fuel mixture of RP-1 / LH2 which is used in the lower atmosphere. Mode  2 also uses LOX, with LH2 as fuel in vacuum where atmospheric influence is negligible.

The use of less dense fuel components at maximum efficiency conditions allows minimizing the volume of fuel tanks and subsequently their mass down to 30%. The RD-701 was developed into the RD-704 with one combustion chamber.

The RD-701 is derived from the hydrogen fueled RD-0120. It is essentially two engines with common hydraulic and pneumatic systems, and boost pumps. 

In August 2020, this record was surpassed by the SpaceX Raptor engine, which reached 33 MPa (330 bar) during a static fire test.

Specifications 

The 'RD-701' is a two chamber engine. It can operate in two modes. In the first, it burns both kerosene and hydrogen, granting it greater thrust and impulse density, allowing for smaller, lighter tanks. In the second, it burns only hydrogen, allowing for greater specific impulse. The RD-701 has two preburners per combustion chamber, both of which run oxygen rich. One is used to pump kerosene and oxygen, the other is used to pump hydrogen and oxygen. 

In mode one, both burn kerosene. Liquid hydrogen is combined with kerosene and oxygen rich preburner exhaust in the combustion chamber. In this mode, it produces 4 MN of thrust, with a vacuum specific impulse of 415s, using 73.7 kg/s of kerosene, 29.5 kg/s of hydrogen, and 388.4 kg/s of oxygen.

In mode two, the preburner used to pump kerosene is shut down, and the other is switched to burning hydrogen. A small amount of kerosene is still used to ensure oxygen is effectively atomised. Gases from the preburner combined with hydrogen in the combustion chamber. In this mode it burns 27.4 kg/s of hydrogen, and 148 kg/s of oxygen. Thrust reduces to 1.6 MN, and specific impulse increases to 460s.

See also 
 MAKS space plane
 Staged combustion cycle
 RD-170 - RP-1/LOX Russian engine
 RD-0120 - LH2/LOX Russian engine

References

External links
Engines of MAKS: RD-701
B.I. Gubanov. Triumph and tragedy of "Energia", Chapter 40: Engines of reusable systems. (in Russian)
Astronautix: RD-701
Astronautix: RD-704
NPO «Energomash»: News of ...  19 June 2007 year (in Russian)

Rocket engines of Russia
Rocket engines using hydrogen propellant
Rocket engines of the Soviet Union